Brandon Vieira (born 6 November 1992), is the French kickboxer and Muay Thai fighter who has held World Kickboxing Network Super Bantamweight world title under oriental rules earned in 2021, and WKN Super Featherweight world titles in two styles of kickboxing simultaneously (oriental rules and low kick), winning both belts in 2019 outside France within the period of four months.

Career

On April 27, 2019 in Rome, Italy Vieira fought Alessandro Morretti for WKN World Super Featherweight title under oriental rules. He won the bout by TKO in the second round.

On July 6, 2019 in Iglesias, Sardinia, Italy Vieira took the fight on a short notice replacing Vasek Sivak, who withdrew due to injury. Riding a three-win streak he challenged two-time WKN European Super Featherweight champion Nicola Canu for WKN World Super Featherweight title in low-kick. He won the fight by a unanimous decision.

On December 18, 2021 in Saint-Fons, France Viera defeated Panomdet of Thailand to become a new WKN World Super Bantamweight champion under oriental rules.

Titles
 2021 - WKN World Super Bantamweight title (Oriental rules)
 2019 - WKN World Super Featherweight title (Oriental rules)
 2019 - WKN World Super Featherweight title (Low kick)

Fight record

|-  style="background:#fbb;"
| 2023-01-07 || Loss ||align=left| Daren Rolland || Duel en Terre des Farangs 2 || Orléans, France || Decision (Unanimous)||  3 ||3:00

|-  style="background:#fbb;"
| 2022-12-03 || Loss ||align=left| Mario Alavarez || La Nuit des Challenges 21 || Saint-Fons, France || Decision (Unanimous)||  3||3:00
|-
|-  style="background:#fbb;"
| 2022-11-19 || Loss ||align=left| Daren Rolland || Arena Victory || Lille, France || Decision (Unanimous)||  3 ||3:00
|-
|-  style="background:#cfc;"
| 2022-06-04 || Win ||align=left| Chutong || Trieste Fight Night || Prosecco, Italy || KO || 2 ||
|-
! style=background:white colspan=9 |
|-
|-  style="background:#cfc;"
| 2022-05-14 || Win ||align=left| Michael Oriolo || Generation Fighter 3 || Valentigney, France || Decision (Unanimous) || 3 || 3:00
|-
|-  style="background:#cfc;"
| 2021-12-18 || Win ||align=left| Zuzu || La Nuit des Challenges 20 || Saint-Fons, France || KO || 2 ||
|-
! style=background:white colspan=9 |
|-
|-  style="background:#fbb;"
| 2021-10-23 || Loss ||align=left| Nguyen Mahn Hung || Generation Fighter 2 || Valentigney, France || Decision (Unanimous)|| 3 || 3:00
|-
|-  style="background:#fbb;"
| 2021-09-30 || Loss ||align=left| Luca Grusovin || MFC 8 || Roussillon, France || Decision (Unanimous)|| 3 || 3:00
|-
|-  style="background:#cfc;"
| 2021-09-29 || Win ||align=left| Emmanouil Kallistis || Generation Fighter || Valentigney, France || Decision (Unanimous) || 5 || 3:00
|-
|-  style="background:#cfc;"
| 2019-12-14 || Win ||align=left| Kongmuangtai  || La Nuit Des Challenges 19 || Saint-Fons, France || KO || 2 || 
|-
|-  style="background:#cfc;"
| 2019-07-06 || Win ||align=left| Nicola Canu || The Night Of Superfight 7 || Iglesias, Italy || Decision (Unanimous) || 5 || 3:00
|-
! style=background:white colspan=9 |
|-
|-  style="background:#cfc;"
| 2019-05-25 || Win ||align=left| Zhou Yingjiang || Oktagon || Monza, Italy || Decision (Unanimous) || 3 || 3:00
|-
|-  style="background:#cfc;"
| 2019-04-27 || Win ||align=left| Alessandro Moretti || Fighting Spirit 7 || Rome, Italy || TKO || 2 || 
|-
! style=background:white colspan=9 |
|-
|-  style="background:#cfc;"
| 2019-03-16 || Win ||align=left| Silviu Vitez || Divonne Muaythai Challenge 4 || Divonne-les-Bains, France || Decision (Unanimous) || 5 || 3:00
|-
|-  style="background:#fbb;"
| 2018-12-15 || Loss ||align=left| Phetnarin Saktance || La Nuit Des Challenges 18 || Saint-Fons, France || TKO || 2 || 
|-
|-  style="background:#c5d2ea;"
| 2018-11-09 || Draw ||align=left| Kunponnoi Sitkaewprapon || Best Of Siam 14 || Paris, France || Decision (Unanimous) || 5 || 3:00
|-
|-  style="background:#fbb;"
| 2018-06-16 || Loss ||align=left| Kim Dima || Rahu Fight II || Bussy-Saint-Georges, France || Decision (Unanimous) || 5 || 3:00
|-
|-  style="background:#fbb;"
| 2018-05-03 || Loss ||align=left| Superbank Sakchaichote || MFC 7 || Saint-Priest, France || Decision (Unanimous) || 5 || 3:00
|-
|-  style="background:#cfc;"
| 2018-02-24 || Win ||align=left| Arthur Meyer || Fighting Edition || Orchies, France || Decision (Unanimous) || 5 || 3:00
|-
|-  style="background:#cfc;"
| 2017-12-16 || Win ||align=left| Tam MacCourt ||  La Nuit Des Challenges 17 || Saint-Fons, France || Decision (Unanimous) || 5 || 3:00
|-
|-  style="background:#fbb;"
| 2017-06-10 || Loss ||align=left| Arthur Meyer || Hurricane Fighting 4 || Châlons-en-Champagne, France || Decision (Majority) || 5 || 3:00
|-
|-  style="background:#cfc;"
| 2017-05-03 || Win ||align=left| Yodchai PK SenchaiMuaythaigym || Dubai Fight || Dubai, United Arab Emirates || Decision (Unanimous) || 5 || 3:00
|-
|-  style="background:#cfc;"
| 2017-03-09 || Win ||align=left| Leklai || MFC 6 || Saint-Priest, France || KO || 2 || 
|-
|-  style="background:#cfc;"
| 2016-11-26 || Win ||align=left| Ringrawee Poptheeratham || Millenium World Muaythai || Saint-Denis, France || Decision (Unanimous) || 5 || 3:00
|-
! style=background:white colspan=9 |
|-
|-  style="background:#cfc;"
| 2016-03-12 || Win ||align=left| Pawel Szymansky || Divonne Muay Thai Challenge || Divonne-les-Bains, France || TKO || 2 || 
|-
| colspan=9 | Legend:

References

1992 births
Living people
French male kickboxers
French Muay Thai practitioners